The Elephant Rocks near Duntroon in North Otago, New Zealand, are a collection of large weathered limestone rocks. The wider area around Duntroon is known for its interesting geology and preserved fossils.

The Elephant Rocks are the weathered remnants of the Otekaike Limestone formation which lies above the Oligocene Kokoamu Greensand.

The rocks themselves are rounded and pockmarked from weathering, but do not specifically resemble elephant shapes. The pasture is part of a private farm, and sheep may be present. Access is permitted via a 5-minute walk across the farmland from opposite a parking bay on the Island Cliff-Duntroon Road. The Alps to Ocean Cycle Trail passes the site.

The Elephant Rocks area has been used as a filming location for the first Chronicles of Narnia movie in 2005 when it was transformed into Aslan's camp.

References

Waitaki District
Rock formations of Otago